Conrad Ross, also known as Conrado Ross (born 8 August 1908) was a Uruguayan football player and manager.

Early and personal life
Ross was born on 8 August 1908 in Montevideo. His brother was Donaldo Ross.

Career
Ross spent his early career in Uruguay with River Plate (Montevideo) and Peñarol.

Ross began his career in Brazil with Portuguesa in 1923, later playing for Juventude.

Ross also spent time as a player in Switzerland with Urania Genève Sport and in France with Sochaux. Ross was also player-manager of both clubs.

He also managed Brazilian clubs Portuguesa, São Paulo, Palmeiras, Guarani and América-SP.

References

1908 births
Year of death missing
Uruguayan footballers
Club Atlético River Plate (Montevideo) players
Peñarol players
Associação Portuguesa de Desportos players
Esporte Clube Juventude players
Urania Genève Sport players
FC Sochaux-Montbéliard players
Association football forwards
Uruguayan football managers
FC Sochaux-Montbéliard managers
Associação Portuguesa de Desportos managers
São Paulo FC managers
Sociedade Esportiva Palmeiras managers
Guarani FC managers
América Futebol Clube (SP) managers
Uruguayan expatriate footballers
Uruguayan expatriate football managers
Uruguayan expatriates in Brazil
Expatriate footballers in Brazil
Expatriate football managers in Brazil
Uruguayan expatriate sportspeople in Switzerland
Expatriate footballers in Switzerland
Expatriate football managers in Switzerland
Uruguayan expatriates in France
Expatriate footballers in France
Expatriate football managers in France
Urania Genève Sport managers